Gino Guerra (16 October 1924 – 28 December 1978) was an Italian cyclist. He competed in the time trial event at the 1948 Summer Olympics.

References

External links
 

1924 births
1978 deaths
Italian male cyclists
Olympic cyclists of Italy
Cyclists at the 1948 Summer Olympics
Cyclists from the Province of Mantua
Sportspeople from Mantua